"Stuck On U" is a song by British duo PJ & Duncan, the first to be taken from their second album, Top Katz (1995). Released as a single in 1995, the song reached number 12 on the UK Singles Chart that July.

Charts

References

1995 singles
Ant & Dec songs
Pop-rap songs
1995 songs
Telstar Records singles
Songs written by Ray Hedges
Songs written by Martin Brannigan
Songs written by Declan Donnelly
Songs written by Anthony McPartlin